The Bureau of Public Affairs (PA) was the part of the United States Department of State that carries out the Secretary of State's mandate to help Americans understand the importance of foreign policy. The Bureau was led by the Assistant Secretary of State for Public Affairs. On May 28, 2019, the bureau merged with the Bureau of International Information Programs into the Bureau of Global Public Affairs, and the duties of the Assistant Secretary of State merged into the duties of the Assistant Secretary of State for Global Public Affairs.

The PA Bureau pursues the State Department's mission to inform the American people and to feed their concerns and comments back to the policymakers. It accomplishes this in a variety of ways, which include:

 Strategic and tactical planning to advance the Administration's priority foreign policy goals; 
 Conducting press briefings for domestic and foreign press corps; 
 Pursuing media outreach, enabling Americans everywhere to hear directly from key Department officials through local, regional and national media interviews; 
 Managing the State Department's websites and developing web pages with up-to-date information about U.S. foreign policy;
 Answering questions from the public about current foreign policy issues by phone, email, or letter; 
 Arranging town meetings and scheduling speakers to visit communities to discuss U.S. foreign policy and why it is important to all Americans; 
 Producing and coordinating audio-visual products and services in the U.S. and abroad for the public, the press, the Secretary of State, and Department bureaus and offices; 
 Preparing historical studies on U.S. diplomacy and foreign affairs matters.

Office of Regional Media Outreach
The Office of Regional Media Outreach (RMO) provides local, regional, specialty, and national media a central connection point to department newsmakers.

Their database of newsmakers enables members of the media to quickly find an expert at the department to provide insight, analysis, and expertise on foreign affairs, news and events. Searches can be made by name, issue, position or language spoken. Once an expert has been identified, their staff will set up an interview for television, radio, or print media.

They list their 47 available experts.

Office of Electronic Information
The Office of Electronic Information and Publications oversees the State Department's website, gathering information from all other parts of the Department, as well as participating in the process of publishing printed documents.

Issues and press
This tab of the State Department's website, gives the official U.S. position on the major issues in the news. As it is the official publication of opinion from the U.S. State Department, it offers its own view of an issue, and any reports that support it. It is a start for preliminary research. On this same tab you can find daily press briefings from the major outlets of official statement. A record of "Remarks, Testimony: Senior Officials" since 2001, "Daily Briefings" and "Remarks, Testimony: Senior Officials" Also available is a statement from Secretary Rice and information about joining the listserv to receive 2-5 briefings a day. RSS Feeds and press releases from the Foreign Press Center, USAID, and the U.S. Mission to the United Nations (USUN). There is a section dedicated to audio and video content, including podcasts. "Major State Department Publications" giving information on past bribery charges and a "Guide to Doing Business" in the U.S. are all available online.

Travel and business
This tab offers important information and tips for Traveling and Business. For travel, they offer   information on properly documenting your identity on trips. Also included is information on visas, and the developing technology of "e-passports".

For business, they offer studies on major foreign markets and subsequent regulations, and provide a tool for "International Market Research".

References

External links

 
 
			

 
Government agencies established in 1944
Public relations in the United States
PA